Titus Day is an Australian talent agent. After attending Sydney Grammar School, Day graduated from the University of Sydney and worked as in-house Legal Counsel at IMG. In 2009 Day founded 6 Degrees Group. Clients included Tina Arena, Lara Bingle, Cassette Kids, Grant Denyer, Brett Kimmorley, Sophie Monk, Lyndsey Rodrigues, Guy Sebastian, Axle Whitehead and Jim Wilson. Titus is currently serving 4 and a half years in prison for stealing close to $1m from Guy Sebastian.

Legal issues
In 2017 Guy Sebastian alleged that Day had defrauded him. In June 2022 Day was found guilty of embezzling Sebastian of $620,000 in the District Court of New South Wales. In November 2022 Day was sentenced to four years in prison with a non-parole period of two and a half years.

References

Living people
Australian white-collar criminals
People educated at Sydney Grammar School
Sydney Law School alumni
Talent agents
1973 births